Walter George Chandoha (November 30, 1920 – January 11, 2019) was a prolific photographer, known especially for his photographs of animals and particularly of cats.  Additional subjects for which he is known are fruits, vegetables, flowers, and New York City street scenes. Over his long career, his archive grew to more than 225,000 photographs including approximately 90,000 photographs of cats. Hyperallergic called him "the one cat photographer to rule them all."

Early life 
He began taking photographs as a child using his family's Kodak camera and later joined a camera club in Bayonne where he learned darkroom skills. After graduating from Bayonne High School, he worked as an assistant to illustrator Leon de Voss.

Career 
Chandoha was drafted into the army during World War II where he served as a press photographer and then as a combat photographer in the Pacific War theater. In 1949, he was graduated from N.Y.U. School of Commerce, Accounts, and Finance under the G.I. Bill. That same year he married Maria Ratti and they moved into an apartment in Queens, New York. On his way home from classes at NYU one night that winter, he found a kitten shivering in the snow. The kitten, Loco, became one of his favorite subjects. His enjoyment of photographing that cat prompted him to become a free-lance photographer and he eventually specialized in photographs of cats. They later moved to a farm in Annandale section of Clinton Township, New Jersey, where they raised their two children and where he died at the age of 98. His last cat was Maddie, a rescue cat the family adopted from New Jersey in 2018.

His preferred method for photographing cats was to meet them at their eye level. He often added his children to the photographs to portray the interactions between young kids and cats.

His photographs were used on more than 300 magazine covers and in thousands of advertisements. He was the author of at least 34 books, including Walter Chandoha's Book of Kittens and Cats, Walter Chandoha's Book of Puppies and Dogs, How to Photograph Cats, Dogs, and Other Animals, How to Shoot and Sell Animal Photos, All Kinds of Cats, and Mind Your Manners!. He and his work were also the subject of many books and museum exhibitions. He was once quoted as saying, "Cats are my favorite animal subject because of their unlimited range of attitude, posture, expression, and coloration."

References

1920 births
2019 deaths
American photographers
American writers
Bayonne High School alumni
New York University Stern School of Business alumni
People from Bayonne, New Jersey
People from Clinton Township, New Jersey